Serge Cormier  (born 1976) is a Canadian Liberal politician, who was elected to represent the riding of Acadie—Bathurst in the House of Commons of Canada in the 2015 federal election.

Early life
Cormier was born and raised in Maisonnette, New Brunswick. His father was an inshore fisherman.

Career
He studied business administration, financing his studies by acquiring a small company. He later worked for the government of New Brunswick as the chief of staff to various government departments, and then as a policy analyst for Brian Gallant in both the office of the Official Opposition and of the Premier of New Brunswick. He served as an advisor to Gallant with responsibility for northern New Brunswick. He worked as a riding organizer for both the federal and provincial Liberal parties.

On April 27, 2015, he was nominated to be the federal Liberal candidate in Acadie—Bathurst for the 2015 election. The riding had been held by Yvon Godin of the New Democratic Party since 1997, but Godin opted to retire rather than seek re-election, and Cormier ran against Jason Godin.  He won the election, in what was considered an upset victory, as the Liberals swept the Atlantic provinces.

Cormier was re-elected in the 2019 federal election.

Personal life

Cormier lives with his partner Isabelle, his two daughters, and his step-son.

Electoral record

References

External links
 Official Website

1976 births
Living people
Members of the House of Commons of Canada from New Brunswick
Liberal Party of Canada MPs
Acadian people
21st-century Canadian politicians
People from Caraquet